Annelies is a full-length choral work based on The Diary of Anne Frank. Annelies is the full first name of Anne Frank, now commonly referred to by her abbreviated forename, Anne.  The music is by British composer James Whitbourn and the libretto is compiled from the diary by Melanie Challenger.

Movements from Annelies were first performed at the National UK Holocaust Memorial Day in Westminster Hall, London on 27 January 2005. The World Premiere of the full work followed in April 2005 at the Cadogan Hall, London, conducted by Leonard Slatkin with the Choir of Clare College Cambridge and the Royal Philharmonic Orchestra.
The fourteen movements are:

 Introit – prelude (instrumental)
 The capture foretold
 The plan to go into hiding
 The last night at home and arrival at the Annexe
 Life in hiding
 Courage
 Fear of capture and the second break-in
 Sinfonia (Kyrie)
 The Dream
 Devastation of the outside world
 Passing of time
 The hope of liberation and a spring awakening
 The capture and the concentration camp
 Anne’s meditation

The US Premiere was presented in April 2007 at Westminster Choir College, Princeton NJ with Lynn Eustis (soprano) under James Jordan and the composer, with a reduced scoring for soprano, choir and chamber ensemble. The final chamber version calls for an ensemble comprising violin, cello, piano and clarinet and was premiered in The Netherlands on 12 June 2009 with Daniel Hope (violin) and Arianna Zukerman (soprano).

In May, 2012, the piece was recorded for Naxos Records by the Westminster Williamson Voices under the direction of James Jordan with Soprano, Arianna Zukerman, the Lincoln Trio, and Clarinetist, Bharat Chandra. The recording was nominated for the 2014 Grammy for Best Choral Performance.

The group reunited for a performance of the piece in April 2019 at the Washington National Cathedral for the celebration of Anne Frank's 90th birthday.

Notes

External links
Works page at G Schirmer Inc
Annelies page at Chester Music
James Whitbourn Official Site

Choral compositions
Cultural depictions of Anne Frank
2005 compositions
Works based on diaries
Songs about the Holocaust
Classical music about the Holocaust